The Mount Broughton Classic was a women's professional golf tournament on the ALPG Tour held at Mount Broughton Golf and Country Club in New South Wales, Australia. The inaugural tournament was played in 2011 and it was last held in 2016.

Winners

References

External links

ALPG Tour events
Golf tournaments in Australia